Incahuasi or Incawasi (possibly from Quechua inka Inca, wasi house) is an archaeological site in Peru. It is located in the Lima Region, Cañete Province, Lunahuaná District.

References 

Archaeological sites in Peru
Archaeological sites in Lima Region